Vladimir Nikolayevich Sasimovich (born 14 September 1968) is a retired javelin thrower who represented the USSR and later Belarus.

His personal best was 87.40 metres, achieved in June 1995 in Kuortane. He was suspended by the IAAF from August 2004 to August 2006.

Seasonal bests by year
1986 - 78.84
1991 - 87.08
1992 - 78.40
1993 - 84.28
1994 - 83.14
1995 - 87.40
1997 - 77.84
1998 - 79.68
1999 - 81.64
2000 - 84.42
2001 - 76.68
2003 - 79.57
2004 - 78.55

Achievements

See also
List of sportspeople sanctioned for doping offences

External links

sports-reference

1968 births
Living people
Belarusian male javelin throwers
Athletes (track and field) at the 1996 Summer Olympics
Athletes (track and field) at the 2000 Summer Olympics
Olympic athletes of Belarus
World Athletics Championships medalists
Soviet Athletics Championships winners
World Athletics U20 Championships winners